Dunvegan is a village on the Isle of Skye in Scotland.

Dunvegan may also refer to:

Places

Canada
Dunvegan, Alberta
Dunvegan Provincial Park, a provincial park in Dunvegan, Alberta
Dunvegan, an unincorporated area in the Municipality of the County of Inverness, Nova Scotia
Dunvegan, Ontario, a township, in North Glengarry
Athlone (Edmonton), a neighbourhood in Edmonton, Alberta, also referred to as Dunvegan

Scotland
Dunvegan Castle, a castle in Dunvegan, Scotland
Loch Dunvegan, a lake in Scotland

United States
Dunvegan (Holly Springs, Mississippi), a historic house in Holly Springs
The Dunvegan, a historic apartment building in Cambridge, Massachusetts

South Africa
Dunvegan, residential suburb of Edenvale, Gauteng

Other
Dunvegan Cup, a 15th-century artifact
, an armed merchant cruiser of the British Royal Navy (1940–1941)
HMS Loch Dunvegan (K425), a frigate of the British Royal Navy (1944–1960)
RFA Fort Dunvegan (A160), a ship of the Royal Fleet Auxiliary
Dunvegan-Central Peace, a provincial electoral district in Alberta, Canada
Dunvegan (electoral district), a former provincial electoral district in Alberta, Canada
Dunvegan Formation, a stratigraphic unit in the Western Canadian Sedimentary Basin
Edmonton, Dunvegan and British Columbia Railway (ED&BC), an early pioneer railway in northwestern Alberta, Canada